Kantar is the official Egyptian weight unit for measuring cotton.

Kantar may also refer to:

Business
Kantar Group, UK-based market research group
Kantar Media, international market research firm
Kantar Media Philippines, Philippines market research firm specializing in broadcast media

Persons
Edwin Kantar (1932–2022), American bridge player
Samir Kantar, also written Qantar, Kuntar, Quntar (born 1962), Lebanese Druze former member of the Palestine Liberation Front
Selâhattin Kantar (1878–1949), Turkish archaeologist, museum director, journalist and playwright

Places
Kantar, Gercüş, a village in the District of Gercüş, Batman Province, Turkey

See also
Kantara (disambiguation)